Un po' d'amore is an Italian album by Dalida containing her top ten Italian hits "Dan Dan Dan" and "L'ultimo valzer".

Track listing
 Un po' d'amore
 Son tornata da te
 Aranjuez la tua voce
 Entrate amici miei
 Mama
 L'aquilone
 Amo l'amore
 Dan Dan Dan
 L'ora dell'amore
 Amare per vivere
 L'ultimo valzer

References

Dalida albums
1968 albums
RCA Records albums
Barclay (record label) albums
Italian-language albums